Yevgeni Dmitriyevich Tsimbal (born 11 February 1986) is a Russian professional football player. He plays for FC Kuban-Holding Pavlovskaya.

Club career
He made his Russian Football National League debut for FC Baltika Kaliningrad on 19 April 2008 in a game against FC Metallurg-Kuzbass Novokuznetsk.

External links
 

1986 births
Sportspeople from Kaliningrad
Living people
Russian footballers
Association football midfielders
FC Baltika Kaliningrad players
FC Sheksna Cherepovets players
FC Volga Ulyanovsk players